Peng (Chinese: 彭; pinyin: Péng; alternative forms of romanization include Pang and Phang (Cantonese, Hakka), Pangestu or Pangestoe (Indonesian), and Bành (Vietnamese)) is a common Chinese family name, ranking 35th most common in 2006. It is the 47th name on the Hundred Family Surnames poem.

Etymology
More commonly used as a surname, this character is also an adjective, meaning "big".

Origin
The surname Peng (彭) is traced to the legend of Peng Zu, God of Longevity, who legend tells lived 800 years. During the Shang dynasty, Jian Keng, a descendant of Zhuanxu, was granted the feudal territory Dapeng (Great Peng), and later adopted the name, Peng Zu.

Distribution
In 2019 it was the 31st most common surname in Mainland China. 

Of the top 30 cities in China, 彭 ranked 9th most common in the city of Changsha.

Korean surname 
The same surname character is also found in Korea, where it is pronounced Paeng. According to South Korea's 2000 Census, 2,825 people in 918 households had this surname. There are two major clan lineages for this surname, each with a different bon-gwan (seat of a clan lineage, not necessarily the actual residence of clan members). The more common one, Jeolgang Paeng (1,578 people in 515 households), claims descent from Paeng U-deok, who came from Zhejiang (pronounced Jeolgang in Sino-Korean reading), China to the Korean peninsula during the reign of King Seonjo of Joseon (r. 1567–1608). The less common one, Yonggang Paeng clan (795 people in 259 households), claims descent from Paeng Jeok, who came from Jinling, China to the Korean peninsula in the retinue of Princess Noguk during the reign of King Chungjeong of Goryeo (r. 1348–1351). Yonggang (Ryonggang) is located in an area that became part of North Korea after the division of Korea.

Notable people 

 Adrian Pang (彭耀顺; born 1966), Singaporean Chinese actor
 Diana Pang (彭丹; born 1972), Hong Kong dancer and actress
 Jacqueline Pang (彭晴; born 1974), Hong Kong radio announcer and author
 Pang Siew Fum (彭秀芳), Malaysian drug trafficker serving life imprisonment in Singapore
 Stella Pang (彭慧芝), Hong Kong engineer
 Prajogo Pangestu (彭雲鵬), Indonesian tycoon
 Peng Bo, Olympic diving medalist
 Peng Chang-kuei(彭長貴), Taiwanese chef.
 Peng Cheng-min (彭政閔), a Taiwanese baseball player
 Peng Chong, a former Chinese politburo member
 Peng Dehuai (彭德怀), the Chinese Communist Party military leader, Marshal of the People's Republic of China.
 Peng Lei (彭蕾), Chinese business executive at Alibaba Group
 Peng Liyuan (彭丽媛), Wife of Chinese Paramount leader Xi Jinping, public figure in her own right.
 Peng Ming-min (彭明敏), Taiwan independence activist, DPP politician and first opposition candidate in a Taiwan presidential election
 Peng Pai  (彭湃), a pioneer of the Chinese agrarian movement and peasants' rights activist
 Peng Sheng-chu, Director-General of National Security Bureau of the Republic of China
 Peng Shilu (彭士禄), the "father of China's nuclear submarines" and the "father of China's naval nuclear propulsion",  as the first chief designer of China's nuclear submarines
 Peng Shige (彭实戈), a Chinese mathematician
 Peng Shuai (彭帅), professional tennis player
 Peng Wan-ru, Taiwanese politician and feminist
 Peng Xiuwen (彭修文), conductor and composer
 Peng Yang (彭羕), Han Dynasty official who served Liu Bei 
 Yiliang "Doublelift" Peng, a professional League of Legends player for Team Liquid
 Peng Zhen (彭真), a leading member of the Chinese Communist Party
 The Pang Brothers (born 1955), Hong Kong, twin brothers Danny Pang Fat (彭發) and Oxide Pang Chun (彭順), screenwriters and film directors
 Peng Qi, fictional character from the 14th century novel, Water Margin
 Eddie Peng Yu-Yan (彭于晏), Canadian-Taiwanese actor
 Peng Yuchang (彭昱暢), Chinese actor
 Peng Xiaoran (彭小苒), Chinese actress
 Peng Fai-nan, Governor of the Central Bank of the Republic of China (1998–2018)
 Pong Cheng-sheng, Deputy Mayor of Taipei
 Peng Jiasheng (彭家聲), leader of the Myanmar National Democratic Alliance Army

See also 
 List of common Chinese surnames
 Pang (surname)
 Penck (surname)
 Five Great Clans of the New Territories
 Fanling Wai

References

Chinese-language surnames
Individual Chinese surnames
Culture in Hunan
Eight surnames of Zhurong